Seremban 3 (Malay: Seremban Tiga) is a satellite town located about six kilometers south west of downtown Seremban in Negeri Sembilan, Malaysia. It is located near Mambau, one of the southernmost edge of Seremban.

Seremban 3 also have education centres such as Universiti Teknologi MARA campus in Seremban. However, Seremban 3 also have a shopping place like Unicity Mall and is currently still under construction. Seremban 3 is close to the nearest Rasah Jaya and Mambau.

Educations
 Universiti Teknologi Mara
 SMK Seremban 3

Towns in Negeri Sembilan